Lloyd Hospital was a community hospital in Quay Road, Bridlington, East Riding of Yorkshire, England. The remaining structure, known as "Medina House", is a Grade II listed building.

History
The hospital was endowed by Miss Alicia Maria Lloyd of Stockton Hall as a memorial to her mother in 1868. It was first established in West View House in North Bridlington as "the Lloyd Cottage Hospital and Dispensary" in May 1871. In April 1876, the hospital moved to new purpose-built facilities on the north side of Medina Avenue facing Medina Cottage, an early 19th century building which was also acquired to form part of the hospital. It joined the National Health Service in 1948. After services transferred to modern facilities at Bridlington Hospital in 1988, the Lloyd Hospital closed and was demolished in 1994. The former "Medina Cottage" was subsequently converted for commercial use as "Medina House".

References

Hospitals established in 1868
1868 establishments in England
Hospitals in the East Riding of Yorkshire
Defunct hospitals in England
Bridlington